Chuaña (possibly from Aymara for oozing of water and other liquids / melting of metals and other things) is a mountain in the Andes of Peru, about  high. It is situated in the Arequipa Region, Caylloma Province, Huanca District. Chuaña lies south-east of the dormant volcano Ampato.

See also 
 Yurac Apacheta

References 

Mountains of Peru
Mountains of Arequipa Region